Trogonophidae (Palearctic worm lizards or desert ringed lizards) is a small family of amphisbaenians, containing five species in four genera.

Geographic range
Trogonophids are found in North Africa, the Horn of Africa, the Arabian Peninsula, and western Iran.

Description
Trogonophids are limbless, carnivorous, lizard-like reptiles highly modified for burrowing. They construct their tunnels with an oscillating motion that forces soil into the walls. Unlike other amphisbaenians, their teeth are fused to their jaws, rather than lying in a groove.

Genera
The following four genera are recognized as being valid.
Agamodon  (three species)
Diplometopon  (monotypic) 
Pachycalamus  (monotypic)    
Trogonophis  (monotypic)

References

Further reading
Goin CJ, Goin OB, Zug GR (1978). Introduction to Herpetology, Third Edition. San Francisco: W.H. Freeman and Company. xi + 378 pp. . ("Trogonophidae", pp. 276–278).
Gray JE (1865). "A Revision of the Genera and Species of Amphisbænians, with the Descriptions of some New Species now in the Collection of the British Museum". Proceedings of the Scientific Meetings of the Zoological Society of London 1865: 442–455. (Trogonophidæ, new family, p. 445).

External links
Trogonophidae in the Reptile Database

 
Lizard families
Legless lizards